The 13019 / 13020 Bagh Express is a express type train of Indian Railways connecting Kolkata (Howrah) with northern Indian town of Kathgodam (Uttarakhand). It is a very popular train among tourists of Eastern India, who are going for the Uttarakhand and Jim Corbett National Park trip. It travels through Indian states of West Bengal, Jharkhand, Bihar, Uttar Pradesh, and Uttarakhand.

Schedule

 Train runs daily from both the direction

Route & Halts

Traction 

 to  :- Howrah based WAP 4 electric locomotive and vice-versa

Direction Reversal

 RMU/.

Coach composition

The train has standard ICF rakes with max speed of 110 kmph.

 1 AC II Tier 
 2 AC III Tier
 7 Sleeper Coaches
 4 General
 2 Second-class Luggage/parcel van
 1 HPC - High Capacity Parcel Van
 1 MIL - Military Reserved Coach

References

External links
 Bagh Express

Rail transport in Howrah
Transport in Haldwani-Kathgodam
Named passenger trains of India
Rail transport in Uttar Pradesh
Rail transport in West Bengal
Rail transport in Jharkhand
Rail transport in Bihar
Rail transport in Uttarakhand
Express trains in India